Ceratomyxa gleesoni is a myxosporean parasite that infects gall-bladders of serranid fishes from the Great Barrier Reef. It was first found on Plectropomus leopardus.

References

Further reading
Sobecka, Ewa, et al. "Morphological and molecular characterization of Ceratomyxa gurnardi sp. n.(Myxozoa: Ceratomyxidae) infecting the gallbladder of the grey gurnard Eutrigla gurnardus (L.)(Scorpaeniformes, Triglidae)." Parasitology research 112.2 (2013): 731–735.

External links

Animal parasites of fish
Veterinary parasitology
Animals described in 2009
Ceratomyxidae